You Receive Me is a song by the Danish dance-pop duo Infernal. It was released as the lead single from the album Muzaik, a revised edition of their second studio album, Waiting for Daylight, in 2001. The song was written by Paw Lagermann, Lina Rafn and Michelle Djarling as the theme song to the second season of the reality television show Big Brother Denmark.

Track listings

Credits and personnel
Written by Paw Lagermann, Lina Rafn and Michelle Djarling
Produced by Infernal and Michelle Djarling
Mastered by Michael Pfundheller @ Flex Studio
"Humbled by Nature": written by Paw Lagermann, Lina Rafn and Adam Powers. Produced by Infernal

Charts

References

2001 singles
Infernal (Danish band) songs
Songs written by Paw Lagermann
Songs written by Lina Rafn
2001 songs